JMM can refer to:

 People
 John Michael Montgomery, American country music singer
 Juan Manuel Márquez, Mexican boxer           
 John Mark McMillan, American songwriter and musician

 Science and technology
 Java Memory Model, the model which defines execution-time constraints on the relationship between threads and data in order to achieve consistent and reliable Java applications.

 Organization
 James Madison Memorial High School, a public high school located in Madison, Wisconsin
 Jharkhand Mukti Morcha, a political party in India

 Others
 Jamiatu Muslim Mindanao, one of the oldest and biggest Madaris in the Philippines

 Jesuit Music Ministry, a record label in the Philippines.
 Jewish Military Museum, London, England

 James Morgan McGill (aka Saul Goodman) a character in AMC's Breaking Bad and the main character of its spin-off Better Call Saul.
 "JMM" (Better Call Saul), an episode of Better Call Saul

 Joint Mathematics Meetings, an annual mathematics conference hosted by the MAA and AMS
 Journal of Medical Microbiology, a scientific journal